Beatrice was the 1989 edition of Sveriges Radio's Christmas Calendar.

Plot
The year is 1889 and for first time after the death of their mother, Johan and Lillan meet their father, seacaptain Mörck. He takes care of the children on board the full-rigged ship Beatrice. With the ship, they sail around the world to pick up food and various other Christmas-related items from different ports around the Earth. They'll be back by Christmas Eve.

References
 

Fiction set in 1889
1989 radio programme debuts
1989 radio programme endings
Fictional ships
Sveriges Radio's Christmas Calendar